The Florida version of the NWA Brass Knuckles Championship was a secondary professional wrestling championship defended sporadically in the National Wrestling Alliance's Florida territory, Championship Wrestling from Florida. As its name suggests, the title was contested in matches in which the participants wore brass knuckles and it existed from 1960 until the title was abandoned, no earlier than late 1984.

Title history

See also
List of National Wrestling Alliance championships

Footnotes

References

Championship Wrestling from Florida championships
Hardcore wrestling championships
National Wrestling Alliance championships
Regional professional wrestling championships